Nella Last (née Nellie Lord; 4 October 1889 – 22 June 1968) was an English housewife who lived in Barrow-in-Furness, Lancashire, England. She wrote a diary for the Mass Observation Archive from 1939 until 1966 making it one of the most substantial diaries held by Mass Observation. Her diary, consisting of around 12 million words, is one of the longest in the English language.

Biography
She was the daughter of local railway clerk John Lord. She married Will Last on 17 May 1911, a shopfitter and joiner. They had two sons together, Arthur (8 August 1913 - 18 May 1979) and Clifford (13 December 1918 - 1991). During the Second World War she volunteered for the Women's Voluntary Service (WVS) and the British Red Cross.

An edited version of the two million words or so she wrote during World War II was originally published in 1981 as Nella Last's War: A Mother's Diary, 1939-45 and subsequently republished as Nella Last's War: The Second World War Diaries of 'Housewife 49 in 2006 when interest for her work grew again. Last's diary from January 1944 to the beginning of May 1945 is currently missing, as it was lost from the Mass Observation collection before it was moved to Sussex University. A second volume of her diaries, Nella Last's Peace: The Post-war Diaries of Housewife 49, was published in October 2008, and a third and final volume Nella Last in the 1950s appeared in October 2010.

Her published writing describes what it was like for ordinary people to live through World War Two, reporting on the bombing of Barrow in April 1941 (including her own home at 9 Ilkley Road) and offering her reflections on a wide range of contemporary issues. Some critics, such as Edward Blishen, see a proto-feminism that anticipates the post-war women's movement in her account of her own marriage and her liberation from housewifery through her war work.

Her younger son Clifford Last (1918-1991) emigrated to Australia following the war and went on to become a noted sculptor, with works displayed at the Ballarat Fine Art Gallery.

Last died on 22 June 1968. Her husband, Will Last died less than a year later on 19 May 1969. Their son Clifford died in Australia in 1991.

TV film
The wartime diaries were dramatised by Victoria Wood for ITV in 2006 as Housewife, 49, which is how she headed her first entry at the age of 49. Wood played the lead role. Other notable cast members included David Threlfall who played her husband Will, Christopher Harper who played her son, Cliff as well as Stephanie Cole as Mrs Waite. Housewife, 49 was released on DVD Region 2 on 21 May 2007 and on DVD Region 1 on 11 March 2008.

References

External links
BBC History feature
Article about Victoria Wood’s TV dramatisation of the diaries
Nella Last at IMDb

1889 births
1968 deaths
English diarists
People from Barrow-in-Furness
History of Barrow-in-Furness
Women diarists